Darko Majstorović (born 15 February 1946) is a Yugoslav rower. He competed in the men's double sculls event at the 1976 Summer Olympics.

References

1946 births
Living people
Yugoslav male rowers
Olympic rowers of Yugoslavia
Rowers at the 1976 Summer Olympics
Place of birth missing (living people)